Michael Friedman (born September 19, 1982 in Dunkirk, New York) is an American former professional racing cyclist, who competed professionally between 2005 and 2014.

Major results

2005
 National Track Championships
1st  Team pursuit
2nd Madison
 1st Univest Grand Prix
2006
 National Track Championships
1st  Individual pursuit
1st  Madison
1st  Team pursuit
2nd Points race
3rd Team sprint
 1st Stage 9 International Cycling Classic
 3rd Overall Parker Mainstreet Omnium
2007
 1st Scratch, 2007–08 UCI Track Cycling World Cup Classics, Beijing
 National Track Championships
1st  Points race
1st  Team pursuit
3rd Individual pursuit
3rd Madison
 2nd Overall Tour of Elk Grove
2008
 2nd Six Days of Burnaby

See also
List of Pennsylvania State University Olympians

References

External links

USA Cycling Olympic Team Bio
Road Results Bio
Founder of bicycle education nonprofit: Pedaling Minds

1982 births
Living people
American male cyclists
American track cyclists
Cyclists at the 2008 Summer Olympics
Olympic cyclists of the United States
People from Dunkirk, New York